The 1988 Florida State Seminoles football team represented Florida State University in the 1988 NCAA Division I-A football season. The team was coached by Bobby Bowden and played their home games at Doak Campbell Stadium.

Defensive back Deion Sanders was a Heisman finalist, finishing in eighth place.

Schedule

Roster

Rankings

Game summaries

at Miami (FL)

Southern Miss

at Clemson

Michigan State

at Tulane

Georgia Southern

East Carolina

Louisiana Tech

at South Carolina

Virginia Tech

Florida

vs. Auburn (Sugar Bowl)

1989 NFL Draft

References

Florida State
Florida State Seminoles football seasons
Sugar Bowl champion seasons
Florida State Seminoles football